The first cabinet of Gheorghe Mironescu was the government of Romania from 7 June to 12 June 1930.

Ministers
The ministers of the cabinet were as follows:

President of the Council of Ministers:
Gheorghe Mironescu (7 - 12 June 1930)
Minister of the Interior: 
Mihai Popovici (7 - 12 June 1930)
Minister of Foreign Affairs: 
Gheorghe Mironescu (7 - 12 June 1930)
Minister of Finance:
Ion Răducanu (7 - 12 June 1930)
Minister of Justice:
Voicu Nițescu (7 - 12 June 1930)
Minister of Public Instruction and Religious Affairs:
Ion Lugoșianu (7 - 12 June 1930)
Minister of the Army:
Gen. Nicolae Condeescu (7 - 12 June 1930)
Minister of Agriculture and Property:
Ion Mihalache (7 - 12 June 1930)
Minister of Industry and Commerce:
Eduard Mirto (7 - 12 June 1930)
Minister of Public Works and Communications:
Pantelimon Halippa (7 - 12 June 1930)
Minister of Labour, Health, and Social Security:
D. R. Ioanițescu (7 - 12 June 1930)

References

Cabinets of Romania
Cabinets established in 1930
Cabinets disestablished in 1930
1930 establishments in Romania
1930 disestablishments in Romania